The MTNL Perfect Health Mela is a five-day annual event centred around prevalent health issues and their prevention. This health fair is held between Dussehra and Diwali in the month of October every year, and features seminars, lectures, entertainment shows, health workshops, free on-ground checkups, pop–up stores, and competitions for schools, colleges and corporates. The event aims to create mass awareness on common healthcare issues in India. The brainchild of cardiologist Dr K K Aggarwal, the event is organised and managed by the Heart Care Foundation of India (HCFI). It is one of the most visited community health events, with a footfall of more than a lakh each year from all segments of society. Over the past two decades, the Mela has conducted many health awareness campaigns including hand hygiene, influenza management, heart health, dengue, and malaria.

History
Perfect Health Mela was held for the first time in 1993. This was commemorated by a stamp issue.

References

Fairs in Delhi
Healthcare in Delhi
Social responsibility
Health campaigns